The  (sometimes written Aizu-Kotetsukai or Aizu Kotetsu-kai) is a yakuza organization in Japan based in Kyoto. Its name comes from the Aizu region, "Kotetsu", a type of Japanese sword, and the suffix "-kai", or society.

In 1992 the Aizukotetsu-kai became one of the first yakuza syndicates named under Japan's new anti-boryokudan legislation, which gave police expanded powers to crack down on yakuza.  Its chairman at the time, Tokutaro Takayama, campaigned publicly against the new laws, and the group launched a lawsuit challenging their constitutionality.  In September 1995 the Kyoto District Court threw out the lawsuit. At its peak in 1993 the group had 1,600 active members. 

In October 2005, the group formed an alliance with the Sixth Yamaguchi-gumi, Japan's largest yakuza clan now led by Kenichi Shinoda (Oyabun) and his second-in-command (Wakagashira) Kiyoshi Takayama.

References

1868 establishments in Japan
Yakuza groups